Vinko Galušić (born 16 July 1954) is a Yugoslav racewalker. He competed in the men's 20 kilometres walk at the 1976 Summer Olympics. He took part in the documentary film "San o Krugovima".

References

1954 births
Living people
Athletes (track and field) at the 1976 Summer Olympics
Yugoslav male racewalkers
Olympic athletes of Yugoslavia
Bosnia and Herzegovina racewalkers
Sportspeople from Tuzla
Mediterranean Games silver medalists for Yugoslavia
Mediterranean Games medalists in athletics
Athletes (track and field) at the 1975 Mediterranean Games